Following is a list of English translations of the Quran. The first translations were created in the 17th and 19th centuries by non-Muslims, but the majority of existing translations have been produced in the 20th and 21st centuries.  

The earliest known English translation is The Alcoran (1649) which is attributed to Alexander Ross, chaplain to King Charles I. It was translated from the French translation, L'Alcoran de Mahomet, by the Sieur du Ryer. 

The Koran, Commonly Called the Alcoran of Mohammed (1734) was the first scholarly translation of the Quran and was the most widely available English translation for 200 years and is still in print. George Sale based this two-volume translation on the Latin translation by Louis Maracci (1698).  Thomas Jefferson had a copy of Sale's translation, now in the Library of Congress, that was used for House Representative Keith Ellison's oath of office ceremony on 3 January 2007. 

Muslims did not begin translating the Quran into English until the early 20th century. The Qur'an (1910) was translated by Mirza Abul Fazl of Allahabad, India. He was the first Muslim to present a translation of the Qur'an in English.The English Translation of the Holy Qur'an with Commentary (1917), translated by Maulana Muhammad Ali, was "the first English translation by an Ahmadiyyah follower to be generally available and to be made accessible to the West." Muhammad Ali was the leader of the Lahori Ahmadis. Wallace Fard Muhammad, the founder of the Nation of Islam, exclusively used Ali's translation.

The Koran Interpreted (1955) by Arthur Arberry was the first English translation of the Quran by an academic scholar of Arabic, Islam, and Sufism. Arberry attempted to maintain the rhythms and cadence of the Arabic text. For many years, it was the scholarly standard for English translations.

The Holy Qur'an: Arabic Text and English Translation (1990) was the first translation by a Muslim woman, Amatul Rahman Omar.

The Noble Quran: Meaning With Explanatory Notes (2007) by Taqi Usmani is the first English translation of the Quran ever written by a traditionalist Deobandi scholar.

Non-Muslim translations
 The Alcoran, Translated Out of Arabic into French. By the Andrew du Ryer, Lord of Malezair, and Resident for the French King, at Alexandria. And Newly Englished, for the Satisfaction of all that Desire to Look into the Turkish Vanities. London: Anno Dom, 1649. 

 The Koran, Commonly Called the Alcoran of Mohammed, tr. into English Immediately from the Original Arabic; with Explanatory Notes, Taken from the Most Approved Commentators. To Which Is Prefixed a Preliminary Discourse. Translated by George Sale. London: C. Ackers, 1734.
 The Koran. Translated by John Medows Rodwell. London: J. M. Dent & Sons Ltd., 1861.
 The Quran. Translated by E.H. Palmer. Oxford: Clarendon Press, 1880.
 The Qur'an: Translated, with a Critical Re-arrangement of the Surahs. Translated by Richard Bell. Edinburgh: T. & T. Clark, 1939.
The Koran Interpreted. 2 volumes. Translated by Arthur Arberry. New York: Macmillan,1955.
 The Koran: A New Translation. Translated by N. J. Dawood. New York: Penguin, 1956.
 The Qur'an: A New Translation. Translated by Thomas Cleary. United States: Starlatch Press, 2004. .
 The Qur'an. Translated by Alan Jones. Edinburgh: Edinburgh University Press, 2007. 
 The Qur'an: A New Annotated Translation. Translated by A.J Droge. Sheffield: Equinox Publishing Limited, 2012. 
 The Qur'an (Norton Critical Editions). Translated by Jane Dammen McAuliffe. New York: W. W. Norton & Company, 2017. .
 The Quran with Christian Commentary: A Guide to Understanding the Scripture of Islam. Translated by Gordon D. Nickel. Grand Rapids: Zondervan Academic, 2020. 
 The Critical Qur'an: Explained from Key Islamic Commentaries and Contemporary Historical Research. Translated by Robert B. Spencer. New York: Bombardier Books, 2022.

Notes

Ahmadi translations 
 The Holy Qurán. Translated by Mohammad Khan. Patiala: Rajinder Press, 1905.
 The English Translation of the Holy Qur'an with Commentary. Translated by Maulana Muhammad Ali. Punjab: 1917. 
 The Holy Quran: Arabic Text and English Translation.Translated by Maulvi Sher Ali. Netherlands: 1955. 
 The English Commentary of the Holy Quran. 5 volumes. Translated by Maulvi Sher Ali, Mirza Bashir Ahmad and Malik Ghulam Farid. Ahmadiyya Muslim Community, 1963.
 The Wonderful Koran: A New English Translation. Translated by Pir Salahuddin. Eminabad: The Raftar-I-Zamana Publications, 1969.
  The Quran. Translated by Muhammad Zafrulla Khan. London: Curzon Press, 1970.
 The Holy Qur'an: Arabic Text and English Translation.Translated by Amatul Rahman Omar and Abdul Mannan Omar. Noor Foundation International, Inc., 1990. .

Notes

Intra-faith translations 
 The Study Quran: A New Translation and Commentary (2015). Edited by Seyyed Hossein Nasr, Caner K. Dagli, Maria Massi Dakake, Joseph E. B. Lumbard, and Mohammed Rustom.New York: HarperOne, 2015. .

Notes

Qur'anist translations 
 Quran: The Final Testament. Translated by Rashad Khalifa. Islamic Productions, 1981. .
 Exposition of the Holy Quran. Translated by Ghulam Ahmed Pervez. Lahore: Tolu-E-Islam Trust, 1996.
 The Qur'an As It Explains Itself. Translated by Shabbir Ahmed. Bedford: Lighthouse, 2003. .
 The Quran: A Reformist Translation. Translated by Edip Yuksel, Layth Saleh al-Shaiban, and Martha Schulte-Nafeh. London: Brainbow Press, 2007. . 
 The Message - A Translation of the Glorious Qur'an. Translated by the Monotheistic Group. London: Brainbow Press, 2008.

Notes

Shi'a translations 
 The Qur'an. Translated by Mirza Abul Fazl. Allahabad: Asgar & Co., 1911.
 The Qur'an. Translated by Mohammed Habib ShakirNew York: Tahirke Tarsile Qur'an, 1968.
 The Holy Qur'an: The Arabic Text and English Translation (1981). Translated by Muhammad Sarwar. Englewood: The Islamic Seminary Inc.,1981.
 The Holy Qur'an. Translated by Syed V. Mir Ahmed Ali. Tehran: Osweh Printing & Publication Co., 1988. 
 The Quran: A Poetic Translation. Translated by Fazlollah Nikayin. 2000. .
 The Qur'an in Persian and English. Translated by Tahere Saffarzadeh. 2001.
 The Qur'an with an English Paraphrase, Translated by Ali Quli Qara'i. Iranian Centre for Translation of the Holy Qur'an/Islamic Publications International, 2005. .
 The Sublime Qur'an. Translated by Laleh Bakhtiar. Chicago: Kazi Publications, Inc., 2007. . 
 The Magnificent Qur'an: A 21st Century English Translation.Translated by Ali Salami. Tempe: Leilah Publication, 2016. .

Notes

Sunni translations 
The Koran. Translated by Hairat Dihlawi. Delhi:  M. H. Press, 1916.
The Meaning of the Glorious Koran. Translated by Muhammad Marmaduke Pickthall. New York: A. A. Knopf, 1930.
 The Holy Qur'an: Translation and Commentary. Translated by Abdullah Yusuf Ali. Lahore: Shaik Muhammad Ashraf Publishers of Bakhshi Bazaar, 1934.
 Tafseru-l-Qur'aan Translated by Abdul Majid Daryabadi. India: 1957.
 The Running Commentary of the Holy Qur-an with Under-Bracket Comments. Translated by Khadim Rahmani Nuri of Shillong, India: Sufi Hamsaya-Gurudwar, 1964.
 The Meaning of the Qur'an.Translated by Muhammad Akbar. Lahore: 1967.
  The Message of the Qur'an: Presented in Perspective (1974) Translated by Hashim Amir Ali. Rutland: C. E. Tuttle Co.,1974. .
 The Message of the Qur'an. Translated by Muhammad Asad. Gibraltar: Dar al-Andalus Limited, 1980. .
 The Qur'an: The First American Version. Translated by Thomas Ballantyne Irving (Al Hajj Ta'lim Ali Abu Nasr). Brattleboro: Amana Books, 1985.
 Al-Qur'an: A Contemporary Translation. Translated by Ahmed Ali. Princeton: Princeton University Press, 1988. 
 The Clarion Call of the Eternal Quran. Translated by Muhammad Khalilur Rahman. Dhaka: 1991.
 The Glorious Qur'an. Translated by Ahmad Zidan and Mrs. Dina Zidan. Zidan,1993. 
 A Simple Translation of The Holy Quran. Translated by Mir Aneesuddin. Hyderabad: Islamic Academy of Sciences, 1993.
 The Glorious Qur'an. Translated by Syed Vickar Ahamed. Kuala Lumpur: TR Group of Companies, 1999. 
 The Holy Qur'an. Translated by Emily B. Assami (Umm Muhammad), Amatullah J. Bantley, and Mary M. Kennedy. Jeddah: Dar Abul Qasim Publishing House, 1997.
 Al-Qur'an: Guidance for Mankind. Translated by M. Farooq-e-Azam Malik. Dearborn: The Institute of Islamic Knowledge, 1997. 
 Towards Understanding the Ever-glorious Qur'an. Translated by Muhammad Mahmoud Ghali. Cairo: Publishing House for Universities, 1997.
 The Noble Qur'an: A New Rendering of Its Meaning in English (1999) Translated by Abdalhaqq Bewley and Aisha Bewley. London: Madinah Press, 1999. .
 Interpretation of the Meanings of the Noble Qur'an. Translated by Muhammad Muhsin Khan and Muhammad Taqi-ud-Din al-Hilali. Chicago: Kazi Publications Inc., 1999. .
 The Majestic Qur'an: An English Rendition of Its Meanings. Translated by Nureddin Uzunoğlu, Tevfik Rüştü Topuzoğlu, Ali Özek, and Mehmet Maksutoğlu. United States: Starlatch Press, 2000. 
 An Interpretation of the Qur'an (2000). Translated by Majid Fakhry. New York: NYU Press, 2002. 
Translation and Commentary on The Holy Quran (2000). Translate by Zohurul Hoque. Holy Quran Publishing Project, 2000. 
The Qur'an. Translated by M. J. Gohari. Oxford: Oxford Logos Society, 2002. 
Quran: The Living Truth. Translated by Shaikh Basheer Ahmed Muhuyiddin. Kerala: Manas Foundation, 2003. 
The Tajwidi Qur'an. Translated by Nooruddeen Durkee. Charlottesville: An-noor Educational Foundation, 2003.
 The Qur'an (Oxford World Classics). Translated by M.A.S. Abdel-Haleem. Oxford: Oxford University Press, 2004. 
 Jamal Ul Qur'an (The Beauteous Qur'an). 3rd edition. Translated by Muhammad Karam Shah Al-Azhari and Anis Ahmad Sheikh. Lahore-Karachi: Zia-ul-Qur'an Publications, 2004.
 Quran Made Easy. Translated by Afzal Hoosen Elias. Karachi: Zam Zam Publishers, 2007. 
 The Meanings of the Noble Qur'an with Explanatory Notes, 2 volumes. Translated by Muhammad Taqi Usmani. Idarat al-Maarif, 2007. 
 The Qur'an with Annotated Interpretation in Modern English. Translated by Ali Ünal. Clifton: Tughra Books, 2008. .
 The Gracious Qur'an: A Modern Phrased Interpretation in English. Translated by Ahmad Zaki Hammad. Reston: Lucent Interpretations, 2008. 
 The Qur'an: A New Translation. Translated by Tarif Khalidi. New York: Penguin Classics, 2008. 
 Irfan ul Quran. Translated by Muhammad Tahir-ul-Qadri. London: Minhaj-ul-Quran Publications, 2009.
 The Holy Qur'an: Guidance for Life. Translated by Yahiya Emerick. Islamic Foundation of North America/Amirah Publishing Co., 2010. 
The Easy Qur'an. Translated by Imtiaz Ahmad. Farmington Hills: Tawheed Center of Farmington Hills, 2010. .
 The Quran: Translation and Commentary with Parallel Arabic Text. Translated by Maulana Wahiduddin Khan. India, Goodword, 2011. 
 The Glorious Qur'an. Translated by Muhammad Tahir-ul-Qadri. London: Minhaj-ul-Quran Publications, 2011. 
 The Wise Qur'an: A Modern English Translation. Translated by Assad Nimer Busool. 2012
Quran in English: Clear and Easy to Read. Translated by Talal Itani. ClearQuran, 2012. 
What is in the Quran? Message of the Quran in Simple English. Translated by Abdur Raheem Kidwai. New Delhi: Viva Books, 2013. .
Anwar-ul-Quran: The Holy Quran with English Translation. Translated by Fode Drame. Scotts Valley: CreateSpace Independent Publishing, 2014. 
The Clear Quran: A Thematic English Translation. Translated by Mustafa Khattab. St. Catharines: SirajPublications, 2015. .
 Noor Al Bayan. English. Translated by Sayed Jumaa Salam. Sacramento: Salam Educational Center, 2018. 
 The Majestic Quran: A Plain English Translation. Translated by Musharraf Hussain al Azhari. Nottingham: Invitation Publishing, 2018. 
 The Qur'an: A Translation for the 21st Century. Translated by Adil Salahi. Villa Park: The Islamic Foundation, 2019. 
 Bridges’ Translation of the Ten Qira’at of the Noble Qur’an. Translated by Bridges team, out of which Fadel Soliman is a main translator. AuthorHouse: Bridges Foundation, 2020. .
 The Qur'an Translated. Translated by D. Shehzad Saleem. Al-Mawrid, 2022.
 The Quran Beheld: An English Translation from the Arabic. Translated by Nuh Ha Mim Keller. Beltsville: Amana Publications, 2022. .

Notes

See also

 List of translations of the Quran
 List of tafsir works
 Quran oath controversy of the 110th United States Congress

References

External links

Quran Archive - texts and studies on the Quran
 Compare English Qur'an Translations Side-by-Side
 Al-Quran 
 Islam Awakened Compares English Qur'an translations verse-by-verse

 The full text of Ross's Translation in pdf
 The full text of Amatul Rahman Omar & Abdul Mannan Omar's Translation in pdf
 The full text of Sale's Translation in pdf
 The full text of Muhammad Ashiq Ilahi Bulandshahrī Muhājir Madanī's translation and commentary in pdf

 
Quran-related lists
Translation-related lists